, this is the list of the 282 Munros, recognised by the Scottish Mountaineering Club ("SMC") and The Munro Society. The Munros are listed by "Section" per the Munro's Tables, and in descending order of height within each section. Hills are divided by sub-region, and hills with less than  relative height (or prominence) are indented. The term Real Munro is used for hills with a prominence above , which is the threshold for a Marilyn. For a single table of all 282 Munros, or all 226 Munro Tops, ranked by height and by prominence, see the "List of Munro mountains in Scotland".

Section one: Firth of Clyde to Strathtay

1c. Loch Lomond to Strathyre
 Beinn a' Chroin (941.4 m) Gaelic: Beinn a' Chroin 
 Ben Lomond (974 m) Gaelic: Beinn Laomainn 
 Beinn Chabhair (932.1 m) Gaelic: Beinn a' Chabhair 

1d. Inveraray to Crianlarich
 Ben Lui (1130 m) Gaelic: Beinn Laoigh 
 Beinn a' Chleibh (916.3 m) Gaelic: Beinn a' Chlèibh 
 Ben Oss (1029 m) Gaelic: Beinn Ois 
 Beinn Dubhchraig (978 m) Gaelic: Beinn Dubh-chreig 
 Beinn Ìme (1011 m) Gaelic: Beinn Ime 
 Beinn Bhuidhe (948.5 m) Gaelic: A' Bheinn Bhuidhe 
 Ben Vorlich (943 m) Gaelic: Beinn Mhùrlaig 
 Beinn Narnain (927 m) Gaelic: Beinn Nàrnain 
 Ben Vane (915.76 m) Gaelic: A' Bheinn Mheadhain

Section two: Loch Rannoch to Loch Tay

2a. Loch Rannoch to Glen Lyon
 Schiehallion (1083 m)
 Beinn a' Chreachain (1080.6 m)
 Beinn Dorain (1076 m)
 Càrn Mairg (1042 m)
 Càrn Gorm (1029 m)
 Meall nan Aighean (981 m)
 Meall Garbh (Càrn Mairg Group) (968 m)
 Beinn Achaladair (1038.5 m)
 Beinn an Dothaidh (1004 m)
 Stuchd an Lochain (960 m)
 Beinn Mhanach (953 m)
 Meall Buidhe (932.1 m)

2b. Glen Lyon to Glen Dochart and Loch Tay
 Ben Lawers (1214 m)
 An Stùc (1117.1 m)
 Meall Garbh (Lawers Group) (1123.1 m)
 Beinn Ghlas (1103 m)
 Meall Greigh (1001 m)
 Beinn Heasgarnich (1077.4 m)
 Meall Corranaich (1069 m)
 Meall a' Choire Leith (925.6 m)
 Creag Mhòr (1047 m)
 Meall nan Tarmachan (1043.5 m)
 Meall Ghaordaidh (1039.8 m)
 Ben Challum (1025 m)
 Meall Glas (959 m)
 Sgiath Chuil (920 m)

Section three: Loch Leven to Connel Bridge and Glen Lochy

3a. Loch Leven to Rannoch Station
 Aonach Eagach - Sgor nam Fiannaidh (967.7 m)
 Meall Dearg (952.2 m)

3b. Loch Linnhe to Loch Etive
 Bidean nam Bian (1149.4 m)
 Stob Coire Sgreamhach (1072 m)
 Beinn a' Bheithir - Sgorr Dhearg (1024 m)
 Sgorr Dhonuill (1001 m)
 Buachaille Etive Mòr - Stob Dearg (1021.4 m)
 Sgor na Bròige (953.4 m)
 Sgùrr na h-Ulaidh (994 m)
 Beinn Fhionnlaidh (959 m)
 Buachaille Etive Beag - Stob Dubh (958 m)
 Stob Coire Raineach (925 m)
 Beinn Sgulaird (937 m)

3c. Glen Etive to Glen Lochy
 Ben Cruachan (1127 m)
 Stob Diamh (999.2 m)
 Meall a' Bhùiridh (1107.9 m)
 Creise (1099.8 m)
 Stob Ghabhar (1090 m)
 Ben Starav (1078 m)
 Stob Coir' an Albannaich (1044 m)
 Meall nan Eun (928 m)
 Glas Bheinn Mhòr (997 m)
 Beinn Eunaich (989 m)
 Beinn a' Chochuill (980 m)
 Beinn nan Aighenan (960 m)
 Stob a' Choire Odhair (945 m)

Section four: Fort William to Loch Ericht

4a. Fort William to Loch Treig

 Ben Nevis (1345 m)
 Càrn Mòr Dearg (1220 m)
 Aonach Beag (1234 m)
 Aonach Mòr (1221 m)
 Stob Choire Claurigh (1177 m)
 Stob Coire an Laoigh (1116 m)
 Sgùrr Choinnich Mòr (1094 m)
 Stob Bàn (977 m)
 Stob Coire Easain (1115 m)
 Stob a' Choire Mheadhoin (1105 m)

4b. The Mamores

 Binnein Mòr (1130 m)
 Na Gruagaichean (1054.2 m)
 Binnein Beag (943 m)
 Sgùrr a' Mhàim (1099 m)
 Am Bodach (1031.8 m)
 An Gearanach (981.4 m)
 Stob Coire a' Chàirn (981.4 m)
 Sgùrr Eilde Mòr (1010 m)
 Stob Bàn (999.7 m)
 Mullach nan Coirean (939.3 m)

4c. Loch Treig to Loch Ericht

 Ben Alder (1148 m)
 Beinn Bheòil (1019 m)
 Geal-Chàrn (1132 m)
 Aonach Beag (1115.8 m)
 Beinn Eibhinn (1103.2 m)
 Càrn Dearg (1034 m)
 Beinn a' Chlachair (1087 m)
 Geal Charn (1049 m)
 Creag Pitridh (924 m)
 Chno Dearg (1046 m)
 Stob Coire Sgriodain (979 m)
 Sgor Gaibhre (955 m)
 Càrn Dearg (941 m)
 Beinn na Lap (935 m)

Section five: Loch Ericht to Glen Tromie and Glen Garry

5a. Loch Ericht to Glen Garry
 Beinn Udlamain (1010.2 m)
 Sgairneach Mhòr (991 m)
 Geal-chàrn (917.1 m)
 A' Mharconaich (973.2 m)

5b. Glen Garry to Gaick Pass
 Meall Chuaich (951 m)
 Càrn na Caim (940.8 m)
 A' Bhuidheanach Bheag (936 m)

Section six: Forest of Atholl to Braemar and Blairgowrie

6a. Glen Tromie to Glen Tilt
 Beinn Dearg (1008.7 m)
 An Sgarsoch (1006.5 m)
 Càrn an Fhidhleir (994 m)
 Càrn a' Chlamhain (963.5 m)

6b. Pitlochry to Braemar and Blairgowrie
 Beinn a' Ghlò - Càrn nan Gabhar (1121.9 m)
 Bràigh Coire Chruinn-bhalgain (1070 m)
 Glas Tulaichean (1051 m)
 Beinn Iutharn Mhòr (1045 m)
 Càrn Bhac (945.1 m)
 An Socach (944 m)
 Càrn an Rìgh (1029 m)
 Càrn Liath (976 m)
 Càrn a' Gheòidh (975 m)
 The Cairnwell (933 m)
 Carn Aosda (915.3 m)

Section seven: Braemar to Montrose

 Lochnagar (1156 m)
 Càrn a' Coire Boidheach (1109.9 m)
 Glas Maol (1068 m)
 Cairn of Claise (1064 m)
 Càrn an t-Sagairt Mòr (1047 m)
 Càrn an Tuirc (1019 m)
 Cairn Bannoch (1012 m)
 Broad Cairn (998 m)
 Creag Leacach (988.2 m)
 Tolmount (958 m)
 Tom Buidhe (957 m)
 Driesh (947 m)
 Mayar (928 m)
 Mount Keen (939 m)

Section eight: The Cairngorms

 Ben Macdui (1309 m)
 Cairn Gorm (1244.8 m)
 Derry Cairngorm (1155 m)
 Braeriach (1296 m)
 Cairn Toul (1291 m)
 Sgor an Lochain Uaine (1258 m)
 The Devil's Point (1004 m)
 Beinn a' Bhùird (1197 m)
 Ben Avon - Leabaidh an Daimh Bhuidhe (1171 m)
 Beinn Mheadhoin (1182.9 m)
 Beinn Bhrotain (1157 m)
 Monadh Mòr (1113 m)
 Sgor Gaoith (1118 m)
 Mullach Clach a' Bhlàir (1019 m)
 Bynack More (1090 m)
 Beinn a' Chaorainn (Cairngorms) (1083 m)
 Beinn Bhreac (931 m)
 Càrn a' Mhàim (1037 m)

Section nine: Spean Bridge to Elgin

9a. The Monadh Liath
 Càrn Dearg (945.7 m)
 A' Chailleach (929.2 m)
 Geal Chàrn (926 m)
 Càrn Sgulain (920.3 m)

9b. Loch Lochy to Loch Laggan
 Creag Meagaidh (1128 m)
 Stob Poite Coire Ardair (1054 m)
 Càrn Liath (1006 m)
 Beinn a' Chaorainn (1052 m)
 Beinn Teallach (914.6 m)

Section ten: Glen Shiel to Glenfinnan

10a. Glen Shiel to Loch Hourn and Glen Quoich
 Gleouraich (1035 m)
 Sgùrr a' Mhaoraich (1027 m)
 Aonach air Chrith (1019.5 m)
 Sgùrr an Doire Leathain (1010 m)
 Sgùrr an Lochain (1004 m)
 Druim Shionnach (987 m)
 Maol Chinn-dearg (980.3 m)
 Creag a' Mhaim (946 m)
 Creag nan Damh (917.2 m)
 The Saddle (1011.4 m)
 Spidean Mialach (996 m)
 Beinn Sgritheall (974 m)
 Sgùrr na Sgine (946 m)

10b. Knoydart to Glen Kingie
 Sgùrr na Cìche (1040 m)
 Garbh Chioch Mhòr (1013 m)
 Ladhar Bheinn (1020 m)
 Sgùrr Mòr (1003 m)
 Sgùrr nan Coireachan (956 m)
 Meall Buidhe (946 m)
 Luinne Bheinn (939 m)
 Gairich (919 m)

10c. Loch Arkaig to Glen Moriston
 Sròn a' Choire Ghairbh (937 m)
 Meall na Teanga (916.8 m)

10d. Mallaig to Fort William
 Gaor Bheinn or Gulvain (987 m)
 Sgùrr Thuilm (963 m)
 Sgùrr nan Coireachan (956 m)

Section eleven: Loch Duich to Loch Ness, South of Loch Mullardoch

11a. Loch Duich to Cannich
 Càrn Eige (1182.8 m)
 Mam Sodhail (1179.4 m)
 Tom a' Choinich (1112 m)
 Toll Creagach (1054 m)
 Beinn Fhionnlaidh (1004.7 m)
 Sgùrr nan Ceathreamhnan (1151 m)
 Mullach na Dheireagain (982 m)
 An Socach (921 m)
 Sgùrr Fhuaran (1068.7 m)
 Sgùrr na Ciste Duibhe (1027 m)
 Sgùrr na Càrnach (1002 m)
 Sgùrr a' Bhealaich Dheirg (1036 m)
 Aonach Meadhoin (1001 m)
 Sàileag (956 m)
 Beinn Fhada (1032 m)
 Ciste Dhubh (979 m)
 A' Ghlas-bheinn (918 m)

11b. Glen Affric to Glen Moriston
 A' Chràlaig (1120 m)
 Mullach Fraoch-choire (1102 m)
 Sgùrr nan Conbhairean (1109 m)
 Sail Chaorainn (1002 m)
 Càrn Ghluasaid (957 m)

Section twelve: Kyle of Lochalsh to Inverness, North of Loch Mullardoch

12a. Kyle of Lochalsh to Garve
 Sgùrr a' Choire Ghlais (1083 m)
 Sgùrr Fhuar-thuill (1049 m)
 Càrn nan Gobhar (Strathfarrar) (992 m)
 Sgurr a' Chaorachain (1053 m)
 Sgùrr Choinnich (999.2 m)
 Maoile Lunndaidh (1004.9 m)
 Sgùrr na Ruaidhe (993 m)
 Lurg Mhòr (987 m)
 Bidein a' Choire Sheasgaich (945 m)
 Mòruisg (928 m)

12b. Killilan to Inverness
 Sgùrr na Lapaich (1151 m)
 Càrn nan Gobhar (Mullardoch)(992 m)
 An Riabhachan (1129 m)
 An Socach (1069 m)

Section thirteen: Loch Carron to Loch Maree

13a. Loch Torridon to Loch Maree
 Liathach - Spidean a' Choire Leith (1055 m)
 Mullach an Rathain (1023.8 m)
 Beinn Eighe - Ruadh-stac Mòr (1010 m)
 Spidean Coire nan Clach (993 m)
 Beinn Alligin - Sgùrr Mhòr (986 m)
 Tom na Gruagaich (922 m)

13b. Applecross to Achnasheen
 Sgorr Ruadh (960.7 m)
 Maol Chean-dearg (933 m)
 Beinn Liath Mhòr (926 m)

Section fourteen: Loch Maree to Loch Broom and Garve

14a. Loch Maree to Loch Broom
 An Teallach - Bidein a' Ghlas Thuill (1062.5 m)
 Sgùrr Fiona (1058.6 m)
 Mullach Coire Mhic Fhearchair (1015.2 m)
 Sgùrr Bàn (989 m)
 Slioch (981 m)
 A' Mhaighdean (967 m)
 Ruadh Stac Mòr (918.7 m)
 Beinn Tarsuinn (933.8 m)

14b. The Fannaichs
 Sgùrr Mòr (1109 m)
 Beinn Liath Mhòr Fannaich (954 m)
 Meall Gorm (949 m)
 Meall a' Chrasgaidh (934 m)
 An Coileachan (923.9 m)
 Sgùrr nan Clach Geala (1093 m)
 Sgùrr nan Each (923 m)
 Sgùrr Breac (999 m)
 A' Chailleach (997 m)
 Fionn Bheinn (933 m)

Section fifteen: Ullapool to the Moray Firth

15a. Loch Broom to Strath Oykel
 Beinn Dearg (1084 m)
 Cona' Mheall (978 m)
 Meall nan Ceapraichean (977 m)
 Eididh nan Clach Geala (927 m)
 Am Faochagach (953 m)
 Seana Bhràigh (926 m)

15b. Loch Vaich to the Moray Firth
 Ben Wyvis - Glas Leathad Mòr (1046 m)

Section sixteen: The Far North

16a. Durness to Loch Shin
 Ben Hope (927 m)

16b. Altnaharra to Dornoch
 Ben Klibreck - Meall nan Con (962.1 m)

16c. Scourie to Lairg
 Ben More Assynt (998 m)
 Conival (987 m)

Section seventeen: Skye and Mull

Bibliography

See also
 Lists of mountains and hills in the British Isles
 List of mountains of the British Isles by height
 List of Munro and Munro Tops in Scotland
 List of Murdos (mountains)
 List of Corbetts (mountains)
 List of Grahams (mountains)
 List of Donald mountains in Scotland

References

External links
 Scottish Mountaineering Club - The SMC maintain the lists of Munros, Munro Tops, Furths, Corbetts and Donalds. They also keep a record of Completionists.
 Walkhighlands guide to the Munros – Features podcasts giving the correct pronunciation and place-name meanings, a 3D visualisation of every route, gradient profiles and route downloads for GPS devices.
 MunroMagic.com – Munro, Corbett and Graham descriptions, pictures, location maps, walking routes and weather reports.
 Hill Bagging - the online version of the Database of British and Irish Hills - Survey reports, the change control database and the GPS database are on Hill Bagging.
 The Munros and Tops 1891–1997 – Spreadsheet showing changes in successive editions of Munros Tables.
 Ordnance Survey Munro Blog - OS is Britain's mapping agency. They make the most up-to-date and accurate maps of the United Kingdom. They have also produced a blog on the Munros.
 Harold Street Munros Lists of GPS waypoints + Grid References for walking in UK mountains and hills in various GPS file formats.
 ScottishHills.com – Hillwalking forum with Munro, Corbett, Graham and Donald, Sub 200's log, maps and trip reports.

 
Peak bagging in the United Kingdom
Tourist attractions in Scotland